Sudipto Chatterjee (born: 26 July 1964) is an Indian performance scholar actor, playwright and poet of Bengali descent.

Chatterjee's His solo performance Man of the Heart, about Lalon Fakir, has received acclaim.

Career 
Chatterjee has taught at New York University, Tufts University and University of California, Berkeley in the US, along with Loughborough University in the UK, and Jawaharlal Nehru University, Centre for Studies in the Social Sciences (Calcutta), National School of Drama and the Heritage Academy in India.

He is (currently) the artistic director of Spectactors, a Kolkata-based Indian theater group.

Sexual harassment allegations 

On 14 October 2019, a student who worked under Chatterjee for a theatrical performance alleged that he sexual harassed her.. Subsequently, two other women raised similar allegations and FIRs were lodged.

Chaterjee rejected the allegations, deeming them to be misconstruals of a particular form of theatrical training involving sexual overtones.  He claimed that he was forced to resign from his teaching position at Heritage Academy. He was arrested, shortly thereafter. Many theater personalities have condemned the incident and rejected Sudipto's defense.

References 

Bengali musicians
Indian theatre directors
1964 births
Living people
Don Bosco schools alumni
University of Calcutta alumni
Musicians from West Bengal